The 2008 FC Tokyo season was the team's 10th season as a member of J.League Division 1.

Competitions

Domestic results

J.League 1

Emperor's Cup

J.League Cup

Player statistics

Other pages
 J. League official site

Tokyo
2008